Valldoreix is a railway station in Sant Cugat del Vallès in the province of Barcelona, Catalonia, Spain. It is served by lines S1, S2, S5, S6 and S7 of the Metro del Vallès commuter rail system, which are operated by Ferrocarrils de la Generalitat de Catalunya, who also run the station.

The station is situated on a curve, and has twin tracks, with two side platforms. It is in fare zone 2C of the Autoritat del Transport Metropolità fare system.

Although the line through Valldoreix opened in 1917, linking Les Planes with Sant Cugat del Vallès, the station itself did not open until 1931.

Gallery

References

External links
 

Stations on the Barcelona–Vallès Line
Transport in Sant Cugat del Vallès
Railway stations in Vallès Occidental
Railway stations in Spain opened in 1931